The Mazda Verisa is a subcompact car based on the jointly engineered  Mazda DY platform. It was launched by Mazda in 2004 and is only available in Japan. The Verisa can be considered either a 'tall hatchback' or a 'low mini MPV'. The Verisa was previewed at the 2004 North American International Auto Show in Detroit as the Mazda MX Micro-Sport, although it was never sold there.

According to Mazda the name Verisa was created by combining the Italian word 'verità' (truth) with the English word 'satisfaction', and the intended result of the term Verisa is to signify 'true fulfillment'.  The car is built with the watchwords "simple, quality and compact" and is targeted towards couples in their 30s with individual style and values. The Verisa was available with a variety of factory and dealer-fitted options.

The Verisa comes in front-wheel drive (2WD) and electronic four-wheel drive (e4WD) configurations. There is one engine option that delivers the following power and efficiency figures:
 Power =  at 6,000 rpm
 Torque =  at 4,000 rpm
 Fuel consumption (2WD) = 5.5 L/100 km combined
  (2WD) = 126.2 g/km
 Fuel consumption (e4WD)  = 5.8 L/100 km combined
  (e4WD) = 135 g/km

In financial year 2004 Mazda produced 19,473 and sold 18,526 units. In financial year 2005 Mazda produced 14,336 and sold 14,416 units. The summary information for financial year 2006 and onwards was not published on the Mazda website.  However, month by month breakdowns for domestic sales of individual car models are available. 

The Verisa received updates in 2006 and 2009.  Two special editions of the car have been released, the 'Brown Collection' in 2005 and the 'Stylish V' in 2007. The car has gained international admirers who question why it has not been made more widely available.

References

External links

Verisa
Mini MPVs
Subcompact cars
Ford B3 platform
Cars introduced in 2004
2010s cars